Supaia is an extinct genus of fern-like plants, possibly seed ferns. Species belonging to the genus lived during the Permian in North America, east Asia, and Madagascar.

References 

Permian plants
Pteridospermatophyta
Prehistoric plant genera
Paleozoic life of North America